The Soul of Hollywood is an album by jazz pianist Junior Mance featuring interpretations of music from motion pictures which was recorded in late 1961 and early 1962 and released on the Jazzland label.

Reception

The Allmusic site awarded the album 3 stars with the review by Alex Henderson stating: "The Soul of Hollywood was an interesting departure for Junior Mance. Most of the time he has been heard in small-group settings, but on this album the pianist is backed by an orchestra arranged and conducted by trombonist Melba Liston.... The Soul of Hollywood isn't quite in a class with Gil Evans or Oliver Nelson's best work, but it's still a decent example of orchestral jazz".

Track listing
 "Never on Sunday" (Manos Hadjidakis) - 2:47   
 "Maria" (Leonard Bernstein, Stephen Sondheim) - 2:51   
 "Tara's Theme" (Max Steiner) - 4:00   
 "Fanny" (Harold Rome) - 4:00   
 "On Green Dolphin Street" (Bronisław Kaper, Ned Washington) - 2:36   
 "One-Eyed Jacks" (Hugo Friedhofer) - 2:33   
 "Exodus" (Ernest Gold) - 2:30   
 "Invitation" (Kaper) - 4:03   
 "The Apartment" (Adolph Deutsch) - 3:35   
 "Goodbye Again" (Georges Auric, Dory Langdon) - 4:09   
 "Spellbound" (Miklós Rózsa) - 3:32

Personnel
Junior Mance - piano
Ernie Royal, Clark Terry - trumpet
Jimmy Cleveland, Britt Woodman - trombone
Romeo Penque - flute
Jerome Richardson - flute, tenor saxophone
Danny Bank - baritone saxophone, bass clarinet
George Duvivier - bass
Osie Johnson - drums
Melba Liston - arranger, conductor
Unidentified orchestra

References

1962 albums
Junior Mance albums
Jazzland Records (1960) albums
Albums produced by Orrin Keepnews
Albums arranged by Melba Liston